Psychotria clarendonensis is a species of plant in the family Rubiaceae. It is endemic to Jamaica.

References

clarendonensis
Endangered plants
Endemic flora of Jamaica
Taxonomy articles created by Polbot